Cal Wilson (born 5 October 1970) is a New Zealand stand-up comedian, author, radio and television presenter.

Early life
After attending high school in Christchurch, New Zealand, Wilson completed a Bachelor of Arts at the University of Canterbury.

Comedy career
She co-founded the Court Jesters improv group in 1990 and was part of the New Zealand team that won the World Theatresports title in Los Angeles in 1994.

She moved to stand-up comedy full-time and in 1997 was the inaugural winner (with Ewen Gilmour) of New Zealand's most prestigious comedy award, the Billy T.  She also regularly appeared on TV3's Pulp Comedy. In recent years she has been working from Melbourne, Australia.

In 2001, Wilson won the Best Newcomer Award at the Melbourne International Comedy Festival. She has appeared to critical acclaim at the Edinburgh Festival Fringe. Her 2006 show Up There, Cal Wilson sold out at the Melbourne International Comedy Festival.

Television
Wilson has appeared on the Australian comedy shows SkitHOUSE, Rove Live, Thank God You're Here, Good News Week, Spicks and Specks, The Project, Celebrity Name Game, Show Me the Movie!, Would I Lie to You? Australia, Have You Been Paying Attention? and Hughesy, We Have a Problem and the New Zealand TV show 7 days.

In 2002, she helped write the screenplay for the New Zealand sitcom Willy Nilly.

In 2007, she was part of the ensemble cast of the Australian sketch comedy TV show, The Wedge.

In 2008, Wilson appeared in the eighth series of the Australian version of Dancing with the Stars. Paired with series 7 winner Craig Monley, she was the 3rd eliminated contestant.

In 2010, she became host of the program Sleuth 101 and also took part in the Melbourne International Comedy Festival Great Debate.

In 2012, she appeared as a guest on the UK comedy quiz show QI (J series) (Episodes 3 - Journeys, and 6 - Joints), and in 2013 was captain of "Team Cal" in the Australian light entertainment television series Slide Show.

In 2018, Wilson voiced Petal and Thorn in the kids' TV series Kitty Is Not a Cat.

In 2019, she recorded a Netflix Original Comedy Special titled Comedians of the World, representing New Zealand. In 2019, she toured a stand-up show, 'Gifted Underachiever'.

In 2022, Wilson participated in the eighth season of the Australian version of I'm a Celebrity...Get Me Out of Here!.

In August 2022, it was revealed that Wilson would host the seventh season of The Great Australian Bake Off alongside Natalie Tran and new judges Darren Purchese and Rachel Khoo.

Radio
In 2007, Wilson co-hosted, with Akmal Saleh, the drive time radio show The Akmal Show with Cal Wilson (later called The Wrong Way Home with Akmal, Cal and Ed), which aired on Nova FM Sydney, Melbourne, Adelaide & Perth. Prior to that role, she was a regular guest on the Triple M program Get This.

In 2009, Wilson co-hosted Mornings on Nova 100 (Melbourne) with Dylan Lewis. She resigned from Nova 100 in November, 2009.

Personal life
Wilson married Chris Woods in January 2008. They have a son and live in Sunshine, a suburb of Melbourne in Australia.

References

Elinks 
 Official Website
 
 Cal's MOSH Profile

1970 births
Living people
New Zealand comedians
New Zealand women comedians
New Zealand expatriates in Australia
New Zealand stand-up comedians
University of Canterbury alumni
Place of birth missing (living people)
21st-century Australian comedians
Australian women comedians
20th-century comedians
I'm a Celebrity...Get Me Out of Here! (Australian TV series) participants
People from Christchurch